Hay Hollow is a valley in Shannon County in the U.S. state of Missouri.

Hay Hollow was named for the production of hay in the area.

References

Valleys of Shannon County, Missouri
Valleys of Missouri